Heart is an unincorporated community in Fulton County, Arkansas, United States.

Lick Creek flows past the east side of the community to join the South Fork Spring River about one mile to the north. Heart Church is located north of the settlement.

Heart is protected by the Agnos-Heart-Glencoe Volunteer Fire Department.

References

Unincorporated communities in Fulton County, Arkansas
Unincorporated communities in Arkansas